

Radio
The New England Patriots' flagship radio station is WBZ-FM 98.5 FM, owned by CBS Radio. The larger radio network is called the "New England Patriots Radio Network", whose 35 affiliate stations span seven states. Gil Santos and Gino Cappelletti were the longtime announcing team.  In 2011, the network debuted a sideline reporter, with former quarterback Scott Zolak handling sideline duty. On July 20, 2012, Gino Cappelletti announced his retirement, ending a 32-year career as the popular color analyst on the team’s radio broadcasts, and was replaced by Zolak. Santos had also announced that 2012 would be his final season.  Former Navy football broadcaster Bob Socci was named to replace Santos beginning in 2013.

By year

 Brock replaced Cappelletti for the first eight games of 2001 because of illness to Cappelletti.
 Cappelletti returned to the broadcast booth for the opening quarter of New England's Week 17 game vs. Miami.

Television
Any preseason games not on national television are shown on CBS affiliate WBZ-TV, along with other stations in the other New England television markets. These games were broadcast on ABC affiliate WCVB-TV from 1995 until the change to WBZ in 2009.

By year

References

External links 
Radio page on Patriots.com

New England Patriots
New England Patriots
 
 
broadcasters
CBS Radio Sports